Frédéric François Groen, heer van Waarder (1814–1882) operated a shipyard in Amsterdam (FF Groen Scheepsbouwwerft de boot), located at 111 Gr Wittenburgerstraat. His sun Herman Frederik (1846-1904) built at least two full-rigged sailing ships, the Vondel (1894) and Nicolaas Witsen (1897), but neither was sold.
So he operated the ships himself.
IN 1897 he retired, HF Groen was not married and had no children an died on 1-10-1904, his great collection of paintings and prints concerning ships were sold in 1905 as well as both ships were sold to the Hamburg shipping company Eugen Cellier.

References 

Vondel and Nicolaas Witsen Deutsches Schiffahrtsmuseum

1814 births
1882 deaths
Dutch shipbuilders
Shipbuilding companies of the Netherlands